Nansen was an unincorporated community in Chickasaw County, Iowa, United States. It was at the junction of 170th Street and Pembroke Avenue.

History
 Nansen was established in Section 10 of Jacksonville Township, a few miles northeast of the county seat of New Hampton.

Nansen's post office operated from 1897 to 1904. The community's population was 22 in 1902.

Nansen was noted in a 1932 article about Chickasaw County's lost villages.

Notes

References

Unincorporated communities in Chickasaw County, Iowa
Unincorporated communities in Iowa